Vaughan Mason & Crew was an American funk and post-disco based group led by Vaughan Mason (October 24, 1950 – April 2, 2020). They are best known for their single "Bounce, Rock, Skate, Roll", which reached number 5 on the US Billboard Hot Soul Singles and number 38 on the Disco Top 100 charts in 1980, riding the crest of the roller disco wave that was popular at the time. In 1981, Vaughan Mason released the single "Jammin' Big Guitar", which charted at number 65. "Bounce, Rock, Skate, Roll" has since been used in various samples by De La Soul, Mr. Magic, Jimmy Spicer, and Daft Punk.

Mason later recorded with Butch Dayo and Raze. Mason died of natural causes in 2020, at the age of 69.

Discography

Studio albums
 Bounce, Rock, Skate, Roll (Brunswick Records, 1980)

Singles

References

External links
 
  as Vaughan Mason
 Official website

African-American musical groups
American funk musical groups
American dance music groups
American boogie musicians
Musical groups established in 1979
Musical groups disestablished in 1982
Musical quartets